Nun Chiagnere Marì (Neapolitan for Don't Cry, Mary) is the second studio album by Neapolitan parody singer-songwriter Tony Tammaro.

Track list 
All tracks were written and composed by Tony Tammaro

 Dinta villa (2:46) 
 L'animale (2:43) 
 Volo di un cazettino (3:28)
 La villeggiatura (3:15) 
 Il mozzarellista (3:17)
 Aerobic Tamar Dance (3:53)
 Pronto Marì (2:23) 
 Tango dei tamarri (4:00)
 U Curnudu (2:43) 
 Puzzulan Rap (2:23)

1991 albums
Tony Tammaro albums